Frank Lewis (born 19 January 1933) is a Jamaican cricketer. He played in four first-class matches for the Jamaican cricket team 1956 to 1959.

See also
 List of Jamaican representative cricketers

References

External links
 

1933 births
Living people
Jamaican cricketers
Jamaica cricketers
Cricketers from Kingston, Jamaica